Blake & Brian was an American country music duo composed of singer-songwriters Brian Gowan (born January 7, 1969 in Temple, Texas) and Blake Weldon (September 13, 1966 in Lufkin, Texas).

The two were paired up by record producer Chuck Howard in 1995. Their self-titled debut album was issued in 1997 on the Curb Records label. The album's lead-off single, "Another Perfect Day", peaked at No. 45 on the Billboard country charts. Country Standard Time gave the album a mixed review, stating that although Gowan and Weldon were "indistinguishable vocally and equally malleable", and although some of the songs were derivative of the Eagles, the more up-tempo tracks were "punch[ed] up... with timeless Texas kick". After releasing this album, they charted two more singles ("The Wish" and "Amnesia"), the latter of which was not included on an album. By 1999, Blake & Brian had parted ways. Gowan released a solo album entitled Warm Spanish Wine in 2000. He also co-wrote Rodney Atkins' 1997 debut single "In a Heartbeat" and three songs on Atkins' 2003 debut album Honesty.

Discography

Blake & Brian (1997)

Track listing
"If Guitars Were Guns" (Brian Gowan, Roger Alan Wade) – 2:21
"Why, Why, Why" (Mark Selby, Doug Hughes) – 2:33
"Saving My Love" (Blake Weldon, Tony Stampley) – 3:43
"The Wish" (Conley White, Sam Hogin, Phil Barnhart) – 3:44
"There Is No End" (Weldon, Bill Rice, Sharon Rice) – 3:29
"Straight to You" (Lee Satterfield, George Teren) – 2:44
"Another Perfect Day" (White, Barnhart, Brian Tabor) – 3:26
"Shut Up Heart" (Michael Huffman, Rick Williamson) – 2:27
"Confederate Rose" (Max T. Barnes, Leslie Satcher) – 3:34
"Don't Apologize for Who You Are" (Troy Seals, Waylon Jennings) – 2:12
feat. Waylon Jennings and Charlie Daniels
"My Only Claim to Fame" (Weldon, B. Rice, S. Rice) – 3:07

Personnel
As listed in liner notes.

Eddie Bayers – drums
Michael Black – background vocals
Bruce Bouton – steel guitar
Dennis Burnside – piano
J.T. Corenflos – electric guitar
Larry Franklin – fiddle
Paul Franklin – steel guitar
John Hobbs – piano
David Hungate – bass guitar
Brent Mason – electric guitar
Terry McMillan – harmonica, percussion
Scott Merry – bass guitar
John Wesley Ryles – background vocals
Paul Scholten – drums
Michael Spriggs – acoustic guitar
Dennis Wilson – background vocals
Glenn Worf – bass guitar

Singles

Music videos

References

External links
Brian Gowan official website
Kevin Blake Weldon official website

American country music groups
Country music duos
Curb Records artists
Musical groups established in 1995
Musical groups disestablished in 1999